The 2013 Cronulla-Sutherland Sharks season is the 47th in the club's history. Coached by Shane Flanagan and captained by Paul Gallen, they competed in the NRL's 2013 Telstra Premiership. The Sharks finished the regular season 5th (out of 16), thus reaching the finals for a second consecutive season. They were then knocked out of contention in the second week of the finals by eventual grand finalists the Manly-Warringah Sea Eagles.

This year Damian Keogh became chairman of the club's board of directors.

Ladder

Results

 Round 1 - Sharks vs Titans (12 - 10) 
  Tries: Matthew Wright, Andrew Fifita

 Round 2 - Rabbitohs vs Sharks (14 - 12)
  Tries: Michael Gordon, Beau Ryan

 Round 3 - Sharks vs Warriors (28 - 4)
  Tries: John Morris, Michael Gordon, Beau Ryan, Sam Tagataese, Jeff Robson

 Round 4 - Sharks vs Dragons (12 - 25) 
  Tries: Jeff Robson, Andrew Fifita

 Round 5 - Eels vs Sharks (13 - 6)
  Tries: Michael Gordon

 Round 6 - Sea Eagles vs Sharks (25 - 18)
  Tries: Nathan Stapleton (2), Stewart Mills

 Round 7 - Shark vs Bulldogs (8 - 24)
  Tries: Luke Lewis

 Round 8 - Knights vs Sharks (20 - 21)
  Tries: Jonathan Wright (2), Beau Ryan, Todd Carney
  Field Goal: Jeff Robson

 Round 9 - Tigers vs Sharks (6 - 30)
  Tries: Sosaia Feki (2), Andrew Fifita, Jeff Robson, Jayson Bukuya

 Round 10 - Sharks vs Raiders (30 - 20)
  Tries: Jonathan Wright, Ben Ross, Isaac De Gois, Jayson Bukuya, Andrew Fifita

 Round 11 - Sharks vs Rabbitohs (14 - 12) 
  Tries: John Morris, Jayson Bukuya

 Round 12 - Bye
 Round 13 - Storm vs Sharks (38 - 6)
  Tries: Beau Ryan

 Round 14 - Sharks vs Eels (32 - 14)
  Tries: Jeff Robson (2), Paul Gallen, John Morris, Nathan Stapleton

 Round 15 - BYE
 Round 16 -  Cowboys vs Sharks (24 - 4)
  Tries: Luke Lewis

 Round 17 - Sharks vs Tigers (36 - 22)
  Tries: Andrew Fifita (2), Wade Graham, Nathan Stapleton, Luke Lewis, Jayson Bukuya

 Round 18 - Broncos vs Sharks (18 - 19)
  Tries: Michael Gordon, Jayson Bukuya, Sosaia Feki
  Field Goal: Todd Carney

 Round 19 - Roosters vs Sharks (40 - 0)
  Tries: No Tries

 Round 20 - Sharks vs Panthers (38 - 10)
  Tries: Michael Gordon (2), Sosaia Feki (2), Todd Carney, Ben Pomeroy

 Round 21 - Warriors vs Sharks (14 - 18)
  Tries: Jonathan Wright, Ben Pomeroy, Nathan Stapleton

 Round 22 -  Sharks vs Knights (14 - 18)
  Tries: Andrew Fifita, Wade Graham

 Round 23 - Dragons vs Sharks (18 - 22)
  Tries: Ben Pomeroy, Isaac De Gois, Beau Ryan, Andrew Fifita

 Round 24 - Sharks vs Roosters (32 - 22)
  Tries: Paul Gallen, Michael Gordon, Jonathan Wright, Chris Heighington

 Round 25 - Sharks vs Cowboys (18 - 31)
  Tries: Jayson Bukuya (2), Jeff Robson

 Round 26 - Raiders vs Sharks (18 - 38)
  Tries: Sosaia Feki, Luke Lewis, Jeff Robson, Tyrone Peachey, Bryce Gibbs, Beau Ryan

 Week 1 Finals - Sharks vs Cowboys (20 - 18)
  Tries: Beau Ryan, Ben Pomeroy, Sam Tagataese, Sosaia Feki

 Week 2 Finals - Sea Eagles vs Sharks (24 - 18)
  Tries: Michael Gordon, Andrew Fifita, Jonathan Wright

Team Stats
 Most Points - Michael Gordon (112)
 Most Tries - Andrew Fifita (9)
 Most Try Assists - Todd Carney (21)
 Most Offloads - Anthony Tupou (40)
 Most Linebreaks - Michael Gordon (14)
 Most Tackles - Andrew Fifita (781)
 Most Runs - Andrew Fifita (436)
 Most Run Metres - Andrew Fifita (3777)
 Most Kick Metres - Todd Carney (6669)
 Most Tackle Busts - Andrew Fifita (114)
 Most Errors - Todd Carney (25)
 Most Linebreak Assists - Todd Carney (14)

References

Cronulla-Sutherland Sharks seasons
Cronulla-Sutherland Sharks seasons